Belantsea (named after a legendary ancestor of the Crow Nation) is a genus of extinct petalodontid cartilaginous fish that lived during the Lower Carboniferous, about 350 million years ago. Its fossils are found in the Bear Gulch Limestone lagerstätte. Its body was leaf-shaped, with muscular fins and a small tail. Such a body plan would allow for great maneuverability, but at the cost of speedy cruising. Its few, large, triangular teeth formed a beak-like arrangement that allowed it to graze bryozoans, sponges, crinoids, and other encrusting animals. The genus contains two species, B. montana and B. occidentalis.

Belantsea is the best known member of the order Petalodontiformes.

References

External links
 Bear Gulch
Belantsea from Discovery Education

Petalodontiformes
Mississippian fish of North America
Fossils of the United States
Prehistoric cartilaginous fish genera
Fossil taxa described in 1989